Four Altos is an album by saxophonists Phil Woods Gene Quill, Sahib Shihab and Hal Stein recorded in 1957 and released on the Prestige label.

Reception

In his review for Allmusic, Scott Yanow stated "generally hard-swinging and well-played, but the strong influence of Charlie Parker makes all of the altoists sound alike".

Track listing
All compositions by Mal Waldron except as indicated
 "Pedal Eyes" - 7:34  
 "Kokochee" (Teddy Charles) - 6:25  
 "No More Nights" (Charles) - 4:58  
 "Kinda Kanonic" (Hal Stein) - 5:59  
 "Don't Blame Me" (Dorothy Fields, Jimmy McHugh) - 4:57  
 "Staggers" - 8:23

Personnel
Phil Woods, Gene Quill, Sahib Shihab, Hal Stein - alto saxophone 
Mal Waldron - piano
Tommy Potter - bass 
Louis Hayes - drums

References

Prestige Records albums
Phil Woods albums
1957 albums
Albums recorded at Van Gelder Studio
Albums produced by Bob Weinstock